The Italian Basketball Supercup, also known as Discovery+ Supercoppa for sponsorship reasons, is a professional basketball super cup competition. From the 2020 Supercup edition, all the teams of LBA took part in the competition. Created in 1995, it is organised by the Lega Basket – who run the LBA and the Italian Cup – in partnership with RCS Sport, and it traditionally opens the season.

History
The 2014 edition of the Supercup was played on October 4 and 5, at Sassari's PalaSerradimigni, in a final four format. Italian League and Italian Cup runners-up Montepaschi Siena (also defending champions), did not participate, after declaring bankruptcy over the summer. Italian League champions EA7 Emporio Armani Milano, comfortably dispatched Enel Brindisi (third in the 2014 cup), by a score of 71–59, in the first semifinal, on the back of Linas Kleiza's and Joe Ragland's long-distance shooting (17 and 16 points respectively), in a mistake-strewn game.

The other semifinal saw cup-holders Banco di Sardegna Sassari, have an easy 89–73 win over Acea Roma (league semifinalist), with the hosts always leading, and Sassari head coach Romeo Sacchetti, rotating his squad.

The final saw Sassari add a second title to their prior cup win, by downing Milano 96–88. The Sardinians started the game on the front foot, leading the first quarter, 29–14, while Milano struggled to score (0-for-6 from three). They continued to drive the game at the start of the second quarter, but Milano found a way back into the game, thanks to stronger defense and a stellar MarShon Brooks, to answer with a 15–0 run from, 36-18 down, with Sassari then finding their scoring shoes to finish the half 50–40. Three's from Ragland and Kleiza helped Milano claw back at the lead, but Brooks missed the shot to equalise, with the quarter ending on 72–68. Sassari would stay in front for the rest of the game, with Supercup MVP Jerome Dyson entertaining the fans. Brooks led all scorers with 26 points, followed for Milano by Ragland (17) and Kleizia (16), whilst Dyson paced the winners with 25, and three other players had 14 points.

The 2015 edition took place in Turin's PalaRuffini, on 26 and 27 September. It pitted Banco di Sardegna Sassari (both league and cup holders) against Grissin Bon Reggio Emilia (league runners-up) and EA7 Emporio Armani Milano (cup finalist and league semifinalist) against Umana Reyer Venezia (league semifinalist) in the semifinals.

Format
In 2000, the Supercup was organised on a bigger scale, with all but one of the Serie A and Serie A2 teams participating (Viola Reggio Calabria were caught up in a tournament in Buenos Aires), with the league and cup holders already qualified for the semifinals.
The next year, the four best-ranked teams in the league took part in a Supercup final four.

The 2014 edition saw the Supercup contested by four squads, with the league champion playing the runner up of the cup, and the cup winner playing the league regular season runner-up (barring that, the next best placed team in the cup and the league are chosen in that order).
The format was confirmed for the following editions.

In 2020 edition all the teams of LBA took part in the Supercup, due to the early conclusion of the 2019–20 LBA season caused by COVID-19 pandemic. The competition consists of 4 round robin groups that qualify 4 teams to the Final Four that was held in Bologna at the Segafredo Arena.
The format was confirmed for the 2021 edition, with a Final Eight in place of a Final Four.

Media scrutiny
Some observers have derided the Italian Basketball Supercup as a, "minor trophy", in contrast to the Italian Cup. Journalist's such as the Corriere di Bologna's, Daniele Labanti, and Panorama's Paolo Corio, reacted to the low spectator turnout at the 2014 edition (as part of a general trend), organised in Sassari, by unfavorably comparing its appeal to that of the top level Italian league, the top level Italian Cup, and the EuroLeague (in which the home team would be involved).

The formula and venue was also criticised, with calls to organise a single final, in a city bereft of a professional club basketball (such as Bari or Palermo), or even abroad, in the manner of the Italian football Supercup.

Title holders 
Mens Sana are the record-holders with seven cups, Treviso and Milano follow with four titles, Virtus Bologna have participated in the most finals (11), winning the cup three times.

 1995: Buckler Beer Bologna
 1996: Riello Mash Verona 
 1997: Benetton Treviso 
 1998: Teamsystem Bologna 
 1999: Varese Roosters
 2000: Aeroporti di Roma Virtus 
 2001: Benetton Treviso 
 2002: Benetton Treviso 
 2003: Oregon Scientific Cantù 
 2004: Montepaschi Siena 
 2005: Climamio Bologna 
 2006: Benetton Treviso 
 2007: Montepaschi Siena 
 2008: Montepaschi Siena 
 2009: Montepaschi Siena 
 2010: Montepaschi Siena 
 2011: Montepaschi Siena 
 2012: Lenovo Cantù
 2013: Montepaschi Siena (revoked)
 2014: Banco di Sardegna Sassari 
 2015: Grissin Bon Reggio Emilia 
 2016: EA7 Emporio Armani Milano
 2017: EA7 Emporio Armani Milano
 2018: AX Armani Exchange Milano
 2019: Banco di Sardegna Sassari
 2020: AX Armani Exchange Milano
 2021: Virtus Segafredo Bologna
 2022: Virtus Segafredo Bologna

The finals 
Player nationalities by national team.

Note: boxscores from Lega Basket (retrieved 21 September 2021)

Performance by club

See also
 Italian Basketball League (LBA)
 Italian Basketball League (Serie A2)
 Italian Basketball Cup
 Italian Basketball Federation
 Italian Basketball All Star Game
 Italian LNP Cup

References

External links
 Results from Lega Basket  Retrieved 14 September 2015

 
Annual sporting events in Italy
Recurring sporting events established in 1995
1995 establishments in Italy
Supercup
Italy
Professional sports leagues in Italy